The 1914–15 United States collegiate men's ice hockey season was the 21st season of collegiate ice hockey.

Regular season

Standings

References

1914–15 NCAA Standings

External links
College Hockey Historical Archives

 
College